Ismail Adil Shah (1498–1534; reigned 1510–34) was the king of Bijapur who spent most of his time extending his territory. His short-lived reign helped the dynasty establish a stronghold in the Deccan.

Early years
Ismail Adil Shah succeeded his father Yusuf Adil Shah as the king of Bijapur as a minor. The affairs of the state were managed by the minister Kamal Khan. During this phase, Kamal Khan imprisoned the young king and tried a coup. Punji Khatun the mother of Ismail hatched a counter-plot and Kamal Khan was stabbed to death in the royal palace.

After the death of Kamal Khan, his son Ismail Khan laid siege to the palace in order to arrest Punji Khatun and Ismail Adil Shah. However, Ismail Khan was killed in the fight at the gates to the palace. Ismail started to manage the affairs of the state with the help of his mother. Ismail was a follower of Shiah faith and declared it to be the faith of the state.

War with Vijaynagar empire
He was defeated by the ruler of Vijaynagar Empire, Krishnadevraya, in the Battle of Raichur.

Conquest of Bidar
He invaded Kasim-Barid of Bidar. Later Kasmim Barid with the Muslim kings of Ahmednagar, Golconda and Berar invaded Bijapur, however, Ismail Adil Shah was able to defend himself and his territory. In this battle, Mahmud Shah of Bidar and his son Ahmed were taken as prisoners.

Bibi Satti, the sister of Ismail Adil Shah was married to Ahmed Shah of Ahmednagar and thus the hostilities were converted to friendship.

Ismail ruled peacefully only before waging a war against Nizam Shah of Ahmednagar, who did not aid Ashad Khan during his conquest against Timraj of Vijayanagar. Nizam Shah was unhappy because he was promised the fort of Sholapur as dowry when he married Ismail's sister Mariam, which was never handed over. Nizam Shah later tried to take Sholapur by force. However, he had to taste failure when Ismail marched and captured forty elephants.

Establishing the Dynasty
For some reason Ismail invaded Bidar, while Kutubshah was coming to help Amir Birad, Ismail sent his trusted General Asad Kahan to obstruct Kutubshah, which he did successfully and later captured Amir Birad when he was drunk. As a treaty Amir Birad agreed to give Humnabad and Bidar. He entered the fort of Bidar with pomp and seated himself on the throne, the same throne under which his father had served. After a while, Amir Birad regained the favour of Ismail Adil Shah and got back the fort.

Ismail Adil Shah seldom faced defeat and his army with the artillery was a force to reckon with.

Death
During his campaign against the Golconda Sultanate he fell ill and died in 1534 A.D. He was buried at the Gogi village. A mahal and a mosque are ascribed to him. After his death his son Mallu, the eldest was crowned however he was deposed through the efforts of his grandmother and General Asad Khan. His younger brother Ibrahim Adil Shah I was declared as the king.

References
 A Visit to Bijapur by H. S. Kaujalagi
 "Avalokana" a sovenior published by the Government of Karnataka
 Centenary Sovenior published by the Bijapur Municipal Corporation

1534 deaths
16th-century Indian Muslims
16th-century Indian monarchs
Adil Shahi dynasty
Sultans of Bijapur
1498 births
1510 in India
1534 in India